Gene C. Howard (September 26, 1926 – November 14, 2021) was an American politician in the state of Oklahoma.

Biography
Howard was born in 1926 in Perry, Oklahoma. He attended the University of Oklahoma, receiving a Bachelor of Laws degree in 1951, and is an attorney. He is also a veteran of World War II, serving in the United States Army in the Pacific Theater. He is married to Belva J. Prestidge; with her he has one child.

Howard was elected to the Oklahoma House of Representatives as a Democrat in 1959 and served until 1963. Two years later, Howard was elected to serve in Oklahoma State Senate for district 36, serving from 1965 to 1983;  he also served as president pro tempore of the Senate from 1975 to 1981.

Howard died on November 14, 2021, at his home in Oklahoma City.

References

1926 births
2021 deaths
People from Perry, Oklahoma
Democratic Party members of the Oklahoma House of Representatives
University of Oklahoma alumni
Democratic Party Oklahoma state senators
United States Army personnel of World War II